Christophe Pélissier (born 5 October 1965) is a French football manager and former player who played as a midfielder. He is currently manager of Ligue 1 club Auxerre.

Managerial career
Pélissier began his managerial career with his former clubs US Revel and AS Muret. In 2007, he helped Luzenac win the amateur 2014 Championnat National and earned promotion into the professional Ligue 2 for the first time. However, the club was prohibited from joining the Ligue 2 for non-sporting reasons, and shortly thereafter Pélissier left the club.

In 2014, Pélissier joined Amiens, and helped them get promoted into the Ligue 1 for the first time in their history. On 29 May 2019, Pélissier became the manager of FC Lorient.

References

External links
FDB Manager Profile
Soccerway Profile

1965 births
Living people
Sportspeople from Haute-Garonne
French footballers
Association football midfielders
French football managers
Amiens SC managers
FC Lorient managers
Ligue 1 managers
Ligue 2 managers
Footballers from Occitania (administrative region)